Luke Leonard Trainor (17 December 1900 – 17 November 1973) was an Australian rules footballer who played with St Kilda in the Victorian Football League (VFL).

In 1933, Trainor played with Myrtleford in the Ovens and King Football League.

Notes

External links 

1900 births
1973 deaths
Australian rules footballers from Victoria (Australia)
St Kilda Football Club players
Old Haileyburians Amateur Football Club players